IL-7 or IL 7 can refer to:
 Interleukin 7
 Illinois's 7th congressional district
 Illinois Route 7